My Shadow may refer to:

"My Shadow", poem by Robert Louis Stevenson
"My Shadow", song by Keane from Night Train, also appearing on The Best of Keane
"My Shadow", top 200-charting song by Jessie J
"My Shadow", song by The Sound of Arrows from Voyage
"My Shadow", song by Jay Reatard from Blood Visions
 "My Shadow", cover of the Jay Reatard song by PUP